Guðlaugur Victor Pálsson (born 30 April 1991) is an Icelandic professional footballer who plays as a defensive midfielder for Major League Soccer club D.C. United. He has previously played for Liverpool, Dagenham & Redbridge, Hibernian, New York Red Bulls, NEC, Helsingborgs IF, Esbjerg fB, Zürich, Darmstadt 98 and Schalke 04.

Club career
Victor was born in Reykjavík to an Icelandic mother and a Portuguese father. His paternal grandfather was a native of Mozambique. He played for Fjölnir but he decided to move to the neighbouring club Fylkir to get a chance to play on higher level. He then moved to Danish side AGF Aarhus in 2007.

Victor joined Premier League team Liverpool in 2009. He played for Liverpool reserves and served as team captain but failed to make the breakthrough into the first-team. He went on loan to Dagenham & Redbridge in November 2010, making his debut for the Daggers in the 1st round of the FA Cup in a 1–1 draw with Leyton Orient. He made three appearances for the club, including an FA Cup tie, before returning to Liverpool.

On 28 January 2011, Victor signed an 18-month contract with Scottish Premier League club Hibernian. Victor was given squad number 91, since 1991 was his birth-year. He made his debut in a 3–0 defeat against Dundee United two days later. Victor scored his first goal for the club with a penalty in a 2–1 win against Kilmarnock on 12 February. Victor played regularly under the management of Colin Calderwood, but featured less regularly after Calderwood was replaced by Pat Fenlon. On 10 January 2012, Hibernian announced that Victor had left the club with immediate effect after an agreement was reached to cancel his contract.

Sky Sports reported on 24 January 2012 that Victor was close to agreeing to terms with Major League Soccer club New York Red Bulls. The signing was confirmed by New York on 10 February 2012. Victor did not command a regular starting place in the New York starting lineup during the 2012 season.

In August 2012, the club loaned Victor to Eredivisie club NEC until May 2013, including an option for permanent signing. On 31 December 2012, he was signed by NEC permanently on a free transfer. He signed a contract until the summer of 2016.

After the relegation of NEC, Victor left the club and signed a contract in August 2014 with Swedish side Helsingborgs IF. He made his league debut for the club on 10 August 2014 in a 0–0 home draw with Norrköping. He was subbed on for Arnór Smárason in the 75th minute.

Victor signed a four-year contract with Danish side Esbjerg fB on 31 August 2015. He made his league debut for the club on 14 September 2015 in a 4–2 home victory over Odense BK. He scored his first goal for the club in the 30th minute of this match.

In July 2017 he signed a three-year contract with Swiss side FC Zürich. He made his league debut for Zürich in a 2–1 home victory over Thun on 30 July 2017. He was subbed on for Sangoné Sarr in the 85th minute. He was captain of the 2017–18 Swiss Cup winning team.

On 9 January 2019, Pálsson signed a three and a half year deal with 2. Bundesliga side SV Darmstadt 98.

On 25 May 2021, he agreed to join FC Schalke 04, newly relegated from Bundesliga, for the 2021–22 season, signing a two-year contract.

On 27 July 2022, he joined Major League Soccer club D.C. United on a contract until the end of 2024 with an option for a further year.

International career
Victor has represented Iceland at Under-17, Under-19, Under-21, and full international levels. He helped Iceland qualify to the 2011 UEFA European Under-21 Football Championship. He scored his first goal for the senior team in a 4–1 win against Liechtenstein on 31 March 2021.

Career statistics

Club

International

Scores and results list Iceland's goal tally first, score column indicates score after each Victor goal.

Honours
FC Zürich
Swiss Cup: 2017–18

Schalke 04
2. Bundesliga: 2021–22

References

External links

 
 Voetbal International profile 
 

1991 births
Living people
Victor Palsson
Association football midfielders
Victor Palsson
Victor Palsson
Victor Palsson
Victor Palsson
Victor Palsson
Victor Palsson
Aarhus Gymnastikforening players
Dagenham & Redbridge F.C. players
Victor Palsson
Hibernian F.C. players
Liverpool F.C. players
Major League Soccer players
NEC Nijmegen players
New York Red Bulls players
Helsingborgs IF players
Allsvenskan players
Scottish Premier League players
FC Zürich players
Swiss Super League players
SV Darmstadt 98 players
FC Schalke 04 players
D.C. United players
2. Bundesliga players
Victor Palsson
Victor Palsson
Expatriate men's footballers in Denmark
Victor Palsson
Expatriate footballers in England
Victor Palsson
Expatriate footballers in Scotland
Victor Palsson
Expatriate footballers in the Netherlands
Victor Palsson
Expatriate soccer players in the United States
Victor Palsson
Expatriate footballers in Switzerland
Designated Players (MLS)